Sternhell may refer to:

 Zeev Sternhell, an Israeli historian and one of the world's leading experts on Fascism
 Sever Sternhell, a Polish born Australian academic and organic chemist

Jewish surnames
German-language surnames
Surnames of Polish origin